China participated at the 2018 Asian Para Games in Jakarta, Indonesia from 6 to 13 October 2018. The Chinese team consisted of 232 athletes who competed in 15 out of the 18 sports of the event.

With Hangzhou hosting the 2022 Asian Para Games, a promotional video was shown at the closing ceremony.

Medal by sport

Medals by date

See also 
 China at the 2018 Asian Games

References

Nations at the 2018 Asian Para Games
China at the Asian Para Games
2018 in Chinese sport